Scaphyglottis longicaulis is a species of orchid found from Central America to northwestern Ecuador. It has been found as an epiphyte growing on Socratea exorrhiza in Panama.

References and external links

longicaulis
Epiphytic orchids
Orchids of Central America
Orchids of Belize
Orchids of Ecuador
Orchids of Panama